Selenium responsive proteins within human biology, are the class of proteins sensitive to selenium, in healthy human beings, in cancer patients, in in-vivo models or in-vitro cell culture models.

The original gi accession (version) numbers have been updated to NCBI accession number and protein names updated accordingly.

References 

Human proteins